Daniel Brands was the defending champion; however, he decided not to compete.
Julian Reister won this tournament, beating Alessio di Mauro 2–6, 6–3, 6–3 in the final.

Seeds

Draw

Finals

Top half

Bottom half

References
 Main Draw
 Qualifying Draw

Internazionali di Monza e Brianza - Singles
Internazionali di Monza E Brianza